In the study of heat transfer, radiative cooling is the process by which a body loses heat by thermal radiation. As Planck's law describes, every physical body spontaneously and continuously emits electromagnetic radiation.

Radiative cooling has been applied in various contexts throughout human history, including ice making in India and Iran, heat shields for spacecraft, and in architecture. In 2014, a scientific breakthrough in the use of photonic metamaterials made daytime radiative cooling possible. It has since been proposed as a strategy to mitigate local and global warming caused by greenhouse gas emissions known as passive daytime radiative cooling.

Terrestrial radiative cooling

Mechanism 
Infrared radiation can pass through dry, clear air in the wavelength range of 8–13 µm. Materials that can absorb energy and radiate it in those wavelengths exhibit a strong cooling effect. Materials that can also reflect 95% or more of sunlight in the 200 nanometres to 2.5 µm range can exhibit cooling even in direct sunlight.

Earth's energy budget 

The Earth-atmosphere system uses radiative cooling to emit long-wave (infrared) radiation to balance the absorption of short-wave (visible light) energy from the sun.

Convective transport of heat, and evaporative transport of latent heat are both important in removing heat from the surface and distributing it in the atmosphere. Pure radiative transport is more important higher up in the atmosphere. Diurnal and geographical variation further complicate the picture.

The large-scale circulation of the Earth's atmosphere is driven by the difference in absorbed solar radiation per square meter, as the sun heats the Earth more in the Tropics, mostly because of geometrical factors. The atmospheric and oceanic circulation redistributes some of this energy as sensible heat and latent heat partly via the mean flow and partly via eddies, known as cyclones in the atmosphere. Thus the tropics radiate less to space than they would if there were no circulation, and the poles radiate more; however in absolute terms the tropics radiate more energy to space.

Nocturnal surface cooling 
Radiative cooling is commonly experienced on cloudless nights, when heat is radiated into space from the surface of the Earth, or from the skin of a human observer.  The effect is well-known among amateur astronomers. The effect can be experienced by comparing skin temperature from looking straight up into a cloudless night sky for several seconds, to that after placing a sheet of paper between the face and the sky. Since outer space radiates at about a temperature of 3 kelvins (−270 degrees Celsius or −450 degrees Fahrenheit), and the sheet of paper radiates at about 300 kelvins (room temperature), the sheet of paper radiates more heat to the face than does the darkened cosmos. The effect is blunted by Earth's surrounding atmosphere, and particularly the water vapor it contains, so the apparent temperature of the sky is far warmer than outer space. The sheet does not block the cold; instead, the sheet reflects heat to the face and radiates the heat of the face that it just absorbed.

The same radiative cooling mechanism can cause frost or black ice to form on surfaces exposed to the clear night sky, even when the ambient temperature does not fall below freezing.

Kelvin's estimate of the Earth's age  

The term radiative cooling is generally used for local processes, though the same principles apply to cooling over geological time, which was first used by Kelvin to estimate the age of the Earth (although his estimate ignored the substantial heat released by radioisotope decay, not known at the time, and the effects of convection in the mantle).

Astronomy 
Radiative cooling is one of the few ways an object in space can give off energy. In particular, white dwarf stars are no longer generating energy by fusion or gravitational contraction, and have no solar wind.  So the only way their temperature changes is by radiative cooling.  This makes their temperature as a function of age very predictable, so by observing the temperature, astronomers can deduce the age of the star.

Applications

Climate change 

The widespread application of passive daytime radiative cooling (PDRC) technologies that use the infrared window (8–13 µm) to dissipate heat through longwave infrared (LWIR) thermal radiation heat transfer with outer space, has been proposed as a method of reducing temperature increases caused by climate change. The installation of passive radiative heat emission technologies has been proposed as necessary to lower the temperature of Earth at a fast enough rate for human survivability. Munday summarized the global implementation of such technologies:Currently the Earth is absorbing ∼1 W/m2 more than it is emitting, which leads to an overall warming of the climate. By covering the Earth with a small fraction of thermally emitting materials, the heat flow away from the Earth can be increased, and the net radiative flux can be reduced to zero (or even made negative), thus stabilizing (or cooling) the Earth (...) If only 1%–2% of the Earth’s surface were instead made to radiate at this rate rather than its current average value, the total heat fluxes into and away from the entire Earth would be balanced and warming would cease.PDRCs mimic the natural process of radiative cooling, in which the Earth cools itself by releasing heat to outer space (Earth's energy budget), although during the daytime, lowering ambient temperatures under direct solar intensity. On a clear day, solar irradiance can reach 1000 W/m2 with a diffuse component between 50-100 W/m2. The average PDRC has an estimated cooling power of ~100-150 W/m2. The cooling power of PDRCs is proportional to the exposed surface area of the installation.

Architecture 

Cool roofs combine high solar reflectance with high infrared emittance, thereby simultaneously reducing heat gain from the sun and increasing heat removal through radiation. Radiative cooling thus offers potential for passive cooling for residential and commercial buildings. Traditional building surfaces, such as paint coatings, brick and concrete have high emittances of up to 0.96. They radiate heat into the sky to passively cool buildings at night. If made sufficiently reflective to sunlight, these materials can also achieve radiative cooling during the day.

The most common radiative coolers found on buildings are white cool-roof paint coatings, which have solar reflectances of up to 0.94, and thermal emittances of up to 0.96. The solar reflectance of the paints arises from optical scattering by the dielectric pigments embedded in the polymer paint resin, while the thermal emittance arises from the polymer resin. However, because typical white pigments like titanium dioxide and zinc oxide absorb ultraviolet radiation, the solar reflectances of paints based on such pigments do not exceed 0.95.

In 2014, researchers developed the first daytime radiative cooler using a multi-layer thermal photonic structure that selectively emits long wavelength infrared radiation into space, and can achieve 5 °C sub-ambient cooling under direct sunlight. Later researchers developed paintable porous polymer coatings, whose pores scatter sunlight to give solar reflectance of 0.96-0.99 and thermal emittance of 0.97. In experiments under direct sunlight, the coatings achieve 6 °C sub-ambient temperatures and cooling powers of 96 W/m2.

Other notable radiative cooling strategies include dielectric films on metal mirrors,  and polymer or polymer composites on silver or aluminum films. Silvered polymer films with solar reflectances of 0.97 and thermal emittance of 0.96, which remain 11 °C cooler than commercial white paints under the mid-summer sun, were reported in 2015. Researchers explored designs with dielectric silicon dioxide or silicon carbide particles embedded in polymers that are translucent in the solar wavelengths and emissive in the infrared. In 2017, an example of this design with resonant polar silica microspheres randomly embedded in a polymeric matrix, was reported. The material is translucent to sunlight and has infrared emissivity of 0.93 in the infrared atmospheric transmission window. When backed with silver coating, the material achieved a midday radiative cooling power of 93 W/m2 under direct sunshine along with high-throughput, economical roll-to-roll manufacturing.

Heat shields
High emissivity coatings that facilitate radiative cooling may be used in reusable thermal protection systems (RTPS) in spacecraft and hypersonic aircraft. In such heat shields a high emissivity material, such as molybdenum disilicide (MoSi2) is applied on a thermally insulating ceramic substrate. In such heat shields high levels of total emissivity, typically in the range 0.8 - 0.9, need to be maintained across a range of high temperatures. Planck's law dictates that at higher temperatures the radiative emission peak shifts to lower wavelengths (higher frequencies), influencing material selection as a function of operating temperature. In addition to effective radiative cooling, radiative thermal protection systems should provide damage tolerance and may incorporate self-healing functions through the formation of a viscous glass at high temperatures.

James Webb Space Telescope
The James Webb Space Telescope uses radiative cooling to reach its operation temperature of about 50 degrees K. To do this, its large reflective sunshield blocks radiation from the Sun, Earth, and Moon. The telescope structure, kept permanently in shadow by the sunshield, then cools by radiation.

Nocturnal ice making in early India and Iran 
Before the invention of artificial refrigeration technology, ice making by nocturnal cooling was common in both India and Iran. Such apparatus consisted of a shallow ceramic tray with a thin layer of water, placed outdoors with a clear exposure to the night sky. The bottom and sides were insulated with a thick layer of hay. On a clear night the water would lose heat by radiation upwards. Provided the air was calm and not too far above freezing, heat gain from the surrounding air by convection was low enough to allow the water to freeze.

See also
 Heat shield
 Optical solar reflector, used for thermal control of spacecraft
 Passive cooling
 Radiative forcing
 Stefan–Boltzmann law
 Terrestrial albedo effect 
 Urban heat island
 Urban thermal plume

References

Thermodynamics
Atmospheric radiation